Digges station is a flag stop station in Digges, Manitoba, Canada.  The stop is served by Via Rail's Winnipeg – Churchill train.  The stop is located along the Hudson Bay Railway line.

Footnotes

External links 
Via Rail Station Information
Government of Manitoba Regional Map

Via Rail stations in Manitoba